is a 1986 Japanese film directed by Yōjirō Takita.

Awards and nominations
11th Hochi Film Award
 Won: Best Film
 Won: Best Actor - Yuya Uchida

References

External links

1986 films
Films directed by Yōjirō Takita
1980s Japanese-language films
1980s Japanese films